Jonathon Reuben (born 10 March 1993) is an Australian professional rugby league footballer who plays as a er for the Norths Devils in the Queensland Cup.

He previously played for the St. George Illawarra Dragons in the NRL.

Background
Reuben was a Norths Devils junior.

Playing career
Reuben was previously contracted to the Canberra Raiders and Sydney Roosters, but never had the opportunity to play first grade with either of those sides. Reuben scored 107 tries in 106 appearances throughout his seven-year career in the Queensland Cup competition. Reuben joined the St. George Illawarra Dragons on a developmental contract in 2022.

2022
In round 14 of the 2022 NRL season, Reuben made his first grade debut for the St. George Illawarra Dragons in his side's 31−12 loss to the North Queensland Cowboys at Townsville Stadium as a late replacement for the injured Mat Feagai, he played a very reasonable game on debut with 14 runs for 201 metres - 2 tackles - 4 Tackle breaks and one linebreak . Making his debut at 29 years and 92 days of age Reuben is one of the game's oldest ever debutants.

Statistics

References

External links
 Dragons profile

1993 births
Living people
Australian rugby league players
Indigenous Australian rugby league players
Norths Devils players
St. George Illawarra Dragons players
Rugby league centres
Rugby league wingers
Rugby league players from Townsville
Sunshine Coast Falcons players